Lord Glacier is a glacier about  long draining from the Coulter Heights of Antarctica to Hull Bay. It was named by the Advisory Committee on Antarctic Names after geophysicist Neal E. Lord, of the University of Wisconsin, whose research focused on theoretical and field analysis of the Ice Stream area of West Antarctica from the late 1980s onwards.

References

Glaciers of Marie Byrd Land